Steven Earl Popkes (born October 9, 1952) is an American science fiction writer, known primarily for his short fiction. He was nominated for the Nebula and Sturgeon Awards for the short story "The Color Winter" (1988).

Career

Steven Popkes was born in Santa Monica, California. He attended the Clarion Writers Workshop in 1978, and his first story, "A Capella Blues", was published in Isaac Asimov's Science Fiction Magazine in May 1982. 

Popkes has published more than 45 short works of fiction.  He was a Nebula and Sturgeon Award finalist for the story "The Color Winter" (1988). In the late 1980s, he was involved in the Future Boston collaboration, a project where a number of Boston area science fiction writers contributed stories set in a common future, where the city of Boston is slowly sinking underwater. One of his more acclaimed stories, "The Egg" (Asimov's, January 1989) is set in the future Boston history, and was later incorporated into his short novel Slow Lightning (1991). His other novels include Caliban Landing (1987), Welcome to Witchlandia (2016), God's Country (2020), Jackie's Boy (2020), Danse Mécanique (2021) and House of Birds (2021). Steven has published a collection of short fiction as well, Simple Things: Collected Stories (2019). 

Popkes was part of the Readercon panels "Global Warming and Science Fiction" (2010) and "Have We Lost the Future?" (2012). He lives in the Boston area.

Bibliography

Novels

Short fiction

References

External links
Official site
 

Living people
20th-century American male writers
20th-century American novelists
20th-century American short story writers
American male novelists
American male short story writers
American science fiction writers
Asimov's Science Fiction people
The Magazine of Fantasy & Science Fiction people
1952 births